Camellia reticulata (syn. C. heterophylla) is a species of flowering plant in the tea family Theaceae, native to southwestern China, in Yunnan and Sichuan Provinces.

Symbolism and uses
Camellia reticulata is the floral emblem of Yunnan. It has a long history of cultivation, both for tea oil and for its ornamental value.

In 1820, Captain Richard Rawes of the East Indiaman Warren Hastings imported the first reticulata to England, (named 'Captain Rawes'). It remained the only known reticulata cultivated in Europe for over a century.

References

reticulata
Endemic flora of China
Flora of Sichuan
Flora of Yunnan
Vulnerable plants